Manayunkia is a genus of annelids belonging to the family Fabriciidae.

The genus has almost cosmopolitan distribution.

Species:
 Manayunkia aestuarina (Bourne, 1883) 
 Manayunkia athalassia Hutchings, Dekker & Geddes, 1981

References

Annelids